The Alley Cat is a 1985 Canadian/French French-language drama film based on the novel of the same name by Yves Beauchemin.

Plot 
Florent (Dupire) and his wife Elise (Spaziani) always had one dream: to own a restaurant. When they meet a strange old man, Egon Ratablavasky (Carmet), their dream becomes a reality, but only to quickly turn into a nightmare when they sadly discover they have been tricked by him and lose everything.

Production
Restaurant scenes were set in and shot at La Binerie Mont-Royal.

Recognition 
 1986
 Genie Award for Best Music Score - Won - François Dompierre
 Genie Award for Best Achievement in Direction - Nominated - Jean Beaudin
 Genie Award for Best Achievement in Sound Editing - Nominated - Serge Viau, Paul Dion
 Genie Award for Best Motion Picture - Nominated - Justine Héroux
 Genie Award for Best Performance by an Actor in a Leading Role - Nominated - Serge Dupire
 Genie Award for Best Performance by an Actress in a Leading Role - Nominated - Monique Spaziani
 Genie Award for Best Screenplay - Nominated - Lise Lemay-Rousseau
 1985
 Montreal World Film Festival Jury Prize - Won - Jean Beaudin (Tied with On ne meurt que 2 fois)
 Montreal World Film Festival Most Popular Film - Won - Jean Beaudin

References

External links 
 
 

1985 films
Canadian drama films
Films based on Canadian novels
Films shot in Florida
Films shot in Montreal
1980s French-language films
Films directed by Jean Beaudin
Films set in Montreal
Films scored by François Dompierre
1985 drama films
French drama films
French-language Canadian films
1980s Canadian films
1980s French films